Mayville station is a historic train station on Front St. in Mayville, North Dakota. It was built in 1897. It was listed on the National Register of Historic Places in 1977 as the Great Northern Railway Depot.

A predecessor building was burned in a fire.  This building, as a new depot, was built in style "noticeably superior to the type of facility usually provided a community the size of Mayville."

The depot is now home to the Goose River Heritage Center, a museum of local history.

References

Railway stations on the National Register of Historic Places in North Dakota
Railway stations in the United States opened in 1897
Former Great Northern Railway (U.S.) stations
Museums in Traill County, North Dakota
National Register of Historic Places in Traill County, North Dakota
Historical societies in North Dakota
Former railway stations in North Dakota
1897 establishments in North Dakota
Transportation in Traill County, North Dakota
Mayville, North Dakota